This is an extensive list of antique guns made before the year 1900 and including the first functioning firearms ever invented. The list is not comprehensive; create an entry for listings having none; multiple names are acceptable as cross-references, so that redirecting hyperlinks can be established for them.

A
Agar machine gun (US - Machine Gun - 1861)
Arquebus (Dutch - 15th Century)
Abus gun (Ottomans - Howitzer)

B 

 Bedil (Nusantara - Hand Cannon - 14th century)
 Brown Bess (UK - Musket - 1722)
 Baker rifle (UK - Muzzleloading rifle - 1800)

C
Caliver (UK - Arquebus - 17th century)
Carcano Rifle (Kingdom of Italy - Rifle - 1891)
Chamelot Delvigne French 1873 (French - Revolver - 1873)
Charleville (French - Musket - 1770s)
Che Dian Chong (China - Arquebus - 16th century)
Coach gun (US - Shotgun - 1850s)
Colt 1851 Navy (US - Revolver - 1851)
Colt Army Model 1860 (US - Revolver - 1860)
Colt Dragoon Revolver (US - Revolver - 1848)
Colt Frontier Six-Shooter (US - Revolver- 1873)
Colt Lightning Carbine (US - Carbine - 1884)
Colt M1861 Navy (US - Revolver - 1861)
Colt M1892 (US - Revolver - 1892)
Colt revolving rifle (US - Repeating Rifle - 1855)
Colt Single Action Army (US - Revolver - 1873)
Confederate Revolving Cannon

E
Enfield 1853 Rifled Musket (UK - Rifle - 1853)
Enfield Revolver (UK - Revolver - 1880)
Evans Repeating Rifle (US - Rifle - 1879-80)

G
Gatling Gun (US - Machine Gun - 1862)
Gorgas machine gun

H
Huochong (China - Hand Cannon - 13th century)
Hinawaju (Japan - Arquebus and Pistol - 16th century?)
Henry Repeating Rifle (US - Rifle - 1850s-1866)

I 

 Istinggar (Nusantara - Arquebus - 16th century)

J 

 Java arquebus (Nusantara - Arquebus - 16th century)

K
Kropatschek (Austrian - Rifle - 1881)
Krag–Jørgensen (Norway - Rifle - 1886)

L
Lebel 1886 (France - Rifle - 1886)
Lee-Metford - MLM (UK - Rifle - 1884)
Lee-Enfield - MLE (UK - Rifle - 1895)
LeMat Revolver (CS - Revolver - 1856)

M
Martini–Henry Mark I, II, III, and IV (United Kingdom - Rifle - 1871)
Maxim Gun (United Kingdom - Machine Gun - 1883)
Mauser C96 (German Empire - Pistol - 1896)
Mitrailleuse (French volley/machine gun - 1851)
M1870 Gasser (Austria-Hungary - Revolver - 1870)
Reichsrevolver M1879 and M1883 (German Empire - Revolver - 1879/1883)
Steyr Mannlicher M1894 (Austria-Hungary - Pistol - 1894)
Mosin–Nagant (Mosin–Nagant - Rifle - 1891)

N
Nordenfelt gun (Sweden - Machine Gun)

P
 Pattern 1800 Infantry Rifle (UK - Muzzleloading rifle - 1800)
Petronel (Arquebus - 16th century)

R
Rast & Gasser M1898 (Austria-Hungary - Revolver - 1898)
Remington Model 1858 (US - Revolver - 1862)
Remington Rolling Block rifle (US - Rifle - 1860s)
Ribauldequin (UK - 1339)

S
Salvator-Dormus M1893 (Austria-Hungary - Heavy Machine Gun - 8×50mmR)
San Yan Chong (China - Hand Cannon - 16th century)
Schmidt M1882 (Switzerland - Revolver)
Schofield Model 3 (US - Revolver - 1875)
Sharps Rifle (US - Rifle - 1848)
Schwarzlose Model 1898 (Austria-Hungary - Pistol - 1898)
Schönberger-Laumann (Austria-Hungary - Pistol - 1892)
Smith & Wesson Model 1 (US - Revolver - 1857)
Smith & Wesson No. 3 Revolver (US - Revolver - 1870)
Smith & Wesson .38 Hand Ejector Model of 1899 (US - Revolver - 1899) 
Spencer Rifle (US - Rifle - 1860)
Springfield Model 1795 Musket (US - Rifle - 1795)
Springfield Model 1855 (US - Rifle - 1855)
Springfield Model 1861 (US - Rifle - 1861)
Springfield Model 1863 (US - Rifle - 1863)
Springfield Model 1865 (US - Rifle - 1865)
Springfield Model 1866 (US - Rifle - 1866)
Springfield Model 1868 (US - Rifle - 1868)
Springfield Model 1871 (US - Rifle - 1871)
Springfield Model 1873 (US - Rifle - 1873)

T
Tu Huo Qiang (Chinese - Fire Lance - 1259)

V
Volcanic Repeating Arms (US - Rifle & Pistol - 1855-56)

W
Walker Colt (US - Revolver -1847)
Winchester Model 1887 (US - Shotgun - 1887)
Winchester Model 1890 (US - Rifle - 1890)
Winchester Model 1894 (US - Rifle - 1894)
Winchester Model 1897 (US - Shotgun - 1897)
Winchester Rifle (US - Rifle - 1873)

X 

 Xun Lei Chong (China - Musket/Hand Cannon - 16th century)

See also
List of firearms
List of World War II firearms
List of pistols
Antique gun

early

de:Liste der Handfeuerwaffen
lb:Lëscht vun den Handfeierwaffen
ms:Daftar senjata api
ru:Список огнестрельного оружия